The 1966 Currie Cup was the 29th edition of the Currie Cup, the premier domestic rugby union competition in South Africa.

See also

 Currie Cup

References

1966
1966 in South African rugby union
Currie